Greenville Township is one of the twenty townships of Darke County, Ohio, United States. The 2010 census found 17,613 people in the township, 4,386 of whom lived in the unincorporated portions of the township, including Woodington.

Geography
Located in the center of the county, it borders the following townships:
Brown Township - north
Richland Township - northeast
Adams Township - east
Van Buren Township - southeast
Neave Township - south
Liberty Township - southwest
Washington Township - west
Jackson Township - northwest corner

The city of Greenville, the county seat of Darke County, is located in central Greenville Township. The unincorporated community of Woodington is on the border between Greenville and Brown townships, and is named after its first settler, John Woodington.

Name and history
Greenville Township was the original township of Darke County, and at first contained all of its territory. It is the only Greenville Township statewide.

Government
The township is governed by a three-member board of trustees, who are elected in November of odd-numbered years to a four-year term beginning on the following January 1. Two are elected in the year after the presidential election and one is elected in the year before it. There is also an elected township fiscal officer, who serves a four-year term beginning on April 1 of the year after the election, which is held in November of the year before the presidential election. Vacancies in the fiscal officership or on the board of trustees are filled by the remaining trustees.  The current trustees are George S. Luce Jr., William Kelly, and Mike Stegall, and the clerk is Barbara Anthony.

References

External links
Greenville Township official website
Darke County official website

Townships in Darke County, Ohio
Townships in Ohio